Stellina may refer to:

 Stellina (astronomy), a digital electronic telescope
 Stellina (liqueur), an herbal liqueur
 Stellina (TV series), an Italian animated television series